Tulpar Air was based in Kazan (Tatarstan), Russia, and was established in late 2004 by absorbing the airline Atlas which specialized in helicopter transport. It has its own maintenance base in Kazan. In 2010 it was Russia's least punctual airline with 21% of flights delayed. Before bankruptcy, TAIF was the majority shareholder.

In January 2014, Tulpar Air was grounded by Russia's air transport regulator Rosaviatsiya due to lapses in standards and issues relating to maintenance and crews, after an unscheduled inspection.

Destinations

According to the summer schedule 2011 airline operated scheduled services in the following cities, the frequency of flights - at least once a week:

From Moscow (Vnukovo)

 Usinsk (operated in codeshare with UTair using Tulpar aircraft)
 Ukhta (operated in codeshare with UTair using Tulpar aircraft)

From Moscow (Domodedovo)

 Baikonur

From Kazan

 Norilsk (via Ufa)

From Krasnoyarsk

 Norilsk
 Chita
 Khabarovsk (then onwards to Irkutsk)

From Khabarovsk

 Petropavlovsk-Kamchatsky
 Anadyr (then onwards to Magadan)
 Magadan

From Novosibirsk

 Norilsk

From Abakan

 Norilsk

Fleet

Incidents

 28 May 2010 - Yak-42 failed to take off from Vnukovo due to problems with the engine.
 28 January 2011 (12:30pm local time) -  Yak-42 made an emergency landing aircraft at Norilsk due to warning of "second engine failure". On board were eight crew members and 111 passengers.
 19 May 2011 (10:55am local time) - Yak-42 carrying out flight from Abakan to Norilsk successfully landed in Norilsk despite very poor weather conditions.
 Evening of 25 May 2011 - Yak-42 made an emergency landing at the international airport of Sochi because of the failure of one of the engines.
 11 June 12011 (7:07am Moscow time) -  Air incident on landing of Yak-42 at Vnukovo after all 4 wheels of the left main landing gear were damaged. There were no injuries.

References

Defunct airlines of Russia
Companies based in Kazan